The next Thuringian state election will be held no later than between August and December 2024 to elect the 8th Landtag of Thuringia. The current government is a minority government consisting of The Left, the Social Democratic Party (SPD), and The Greens, led by Minister President Bodo Ramelow of The Left.

As a result of the 2020 Thuringian government crisis, there was a cross-party agreement to hold an early Landtag election on 25 April 2021. In January 2021, the parties involved agreed to postpone the election to 26 September due to the COVID-19 pandemic in Germany. All plans for a snap election were later shelved when it became clear there were not sufficient votes to dissolve the Landtag.

Election date
According to § 18 of the Thuringian Electoral Law for the Landtag, the Landtag election must take place on a Sunday or public holiday at the earliest 57 months after the beginning of the current parliamentary term on 5 February 2020 and at the latest 61 months after, i.e. at the earliest in August 2024 and at the latest December 2024.

According to the Thuringian Constitution, an early election may be held if, at the request of one-third of its members, the Landtag votes with a two-thirds majority to dissolve itself. This may also occur if the Landtag does not vote confidence in a Minister President within three weeks of a failed vote of confidence in the incumbent. The motion to dissolve the Landtag may only be voted on between the eleven and thirty days after its submission. If passed, the election must then take place within 70 days.

On 21 February 2020, The Left, CDU, SPD, and Greens came to an agreement to schedule a new election for 25 April 2021. On 14 January 2021, the four parties agreed to postpone the election to 26 September 2021, the same date as the upcoming federal election.

The vote to dissolve the Landtag was scheduled for 19 July. However, the motion was withdrawn on 16 July after four CDU and two Left members informed party leaders they would vote against it, leaving it clearly short of the required two-thirds majority. Left parliamentary leader Stefan Dittes announced there would not be another effort to dissolve the Landtag, and the red-red-green minority government would continue.

Background

Previous election

In the previous state election held on 27 October 2019, The Left became the largest party for the first time in any German state, winning 31.0% of votes cast. The Alternative for Germany (AfD) made the largest gains, increasing its voteshare by almost 13 percentage points and became the second largest party with 23.4%. The Christian Democratic Union (CDU), which had previously been the largest party in the Landtag, lost almost 12 points and fell to third place with 21.7%. The Social Democratic Party (SPD) placed fourth on 8.2%. The Greens narrowly retained their position in the legislature, winning 5.2% of votes. The Free Democratic (FDP) entered the Landtag for the first time since 2009, exceeding the 5% electoral threshold by just 73 votes.

Incumbent Minister President Bodo Ramelow of The Left had led a coalition government of The Left, SPD, and Greens since 2014. The Left's gains were offset by losses for the SPD and Greens, and the coalition lost its majority.

Government crisis

On 5 February, the Landtag narrowly elected the FDP's state leader Thomas Kemmerich as Minister President, with 45 votes to incumbent Bodo Ramelow's 44. Kemmerich was elected with the support of the FDP, CDU and, controversially, the AfD. This was the first time AfD had been involved in the election of a head of state government in Germany. The apparent cooperation of the three parties was viewed by some as breaking the cordon sanitaire around AfD which had been in place since its formation, in which all other parties sought to deny AfD government or political influence, refusing to negotiate or work with them on any level. This sparked major controversy nationwide, with many politicians expressing their outrage, including federal Chancellor and former CDU leader Angela Merkel, who described it as "unforgivable" and condemned her party's involvement. Kemmerich announced his pending resignation on 6 February, just a day after taking office. He submitted his resignation 8 February, but remained in office in an interim capacity.

Following discussions, The Left, CDU, SPD, and Greens announced on 21 February that they had reached an agreement to hold a new election for Minister President on 4 March 2020, and a new state election on 25 April 2021. The four parties stated that they would support Ramelow for Minister President, and that he would lead an interim government for the next 13 months until the election is held. This government would comprise the same red-red-green arrangement which governed Thuringia from 2014 to February 2020 but would not seek to pass a budget before the election. Between them, the four parties hold 63 of the 90 seats in the Landtag (70%), more than the two-thirds required to dissolve the Landtag and trigger an early election. Ramelow was elected Minister President by the Landtag after three rounds of voting on 4 March. In the first two rounds, The Left, SPD, and Greens voted for Ramelow, while AfD voted for Höcke, the CDU abstained, and the FDP did not vote or abstain. In the third round, Höcke withdrew, and Ramelow was elected with 43 in favour, 23 against, and 20 abstentions.

Parties
The table below lists parties currently represented in the 7th Landtag of Thuringia.

Campaign

Lead candidates
On 15 June 2020, the SPD elected Georg Maier as state chairman and lead candidate for the planned 2021 election. This came after previous leader Wolfgang Tiefensee resigned his position.

In September 2020, former Federal Commissioner for the New States Christian Hirte was elected as state CDU chairman, succeeding Mike Mohring, who had resigned during the government crisis in February. On 17 November, the state executive nominated parliamentary group leader Mario Voigt as their preferred lead candidate.

After extended pressure from the federal FDP as well as other state branches, Thomas Kemmerich announced on 11 December that he would not stand as his party's lead candidate in the planned 2021 election.

Opinion polls

Party polling

Minister President polling

Preferred coalition

Notes

References

External links

Elections in Thuringia
Elections postponed due to the COVID-19 pandemic
2024 elections in Germany